Nathan Retro (born 18 November 1987), professionally known under the mononym Retro, is an English electronic, dance music, futurepop, grime, hip-hop, R&B and rock producer and DJ from Bradford. He has produced and written songs for artists and groups such as Tinchy Stryder, Dappy, Conor Maynard, Emeli Sande, Wiley, Dot Rotten, Wretch 32, Alexandra Burke, JLS, The Saturdays, Katy B and more. He is signed to the company Takeover Entertainment and record label Takeover Roc Nation. He is known for his retro-futurism style of musical composition.

Career

Early career
Nathan Retro moved to Manchester, England in 2006 to further his education in music and take his career to the next level. After tireless hours working day and night perfecting his sound, Nathan Retro has become something of a musical genius. After 4 years of hard work and determination he secured a publishing deal with Takeover/Cloud 9 and also signed to Takeover Entertainment in July 2009 and Takeover Roc Nation in 2011.

(2011-present)
In April 2011, an instrumental named "Lunar Riddim" created by Nathan Retro and MNEK was used during Nike's Air Lunar campaign starring Mario Balotelli.

Nathan Retro is currently working with Dappy, JLS, The Saturdays, Leona Lewis, Cher Lloyd, One Direction, Alexandra Burke, Dot Rotten, Wretch 32, Loick Essien and many more.

Production style
Nathan Retro, a futuristic super producer with many talents (drums, keyboard, bass, guitar) has quickly built a strong reputation within the music industry, with blending innovative and unique sounds with thumping beats and heart filled lyrics into songs that everyone can relate to.

He works alongside his long-time production partner David Dawood, and they both produced Dappy's third single "Come with Me", from his debut studio album titled Bad Intentions.

Discography

Production & Song Writing Credits

2009 – Present

Remixography

Singles

References

External links

Takeover Entertainment artists
1987 births
Living people
Club DJs
English electronic musicians
English dance musicians
English DJs
Musicians from Bradford
English record producers
Electronic dance music DJs